Canadian inventions and discoveries are objects, processes, or techniques—invented, innovated, or discovered—that owe their existence either partially or entirely to a person born in Canada, a citizen of Canada, or a company or organization based in Canada. Some of these inventions were funded by National Research Council Canada (NRCC), which has been an important factor in innovation and technological advancement. Often, things discovered for the first time are also called inventions and in many cases, there is no clear line between the two.

The following is a list of inventions, innovations or discoveries known or generally recognized to be Canadian.

Inventions and improvements 
Notable Canadian inventions and improvements to existing technologies include:

Computing, film, and animation

 Archie (search engine) — the first internet search engine, invented by Alan Emtage at McGill University around 1988.
Film colorization — invented by Wilson Markle in 1983.
IMAX movie system — co-invented by Graeme Ferguson, Roman Kroitor, and Robert Kerr in 1968, following the creation of what is now the IMAX Corporation.
Java programming language — invented by James Gosling in 1994.
Keyframe animation — co-invented by Nestor Burtnyk and Marcelli Wein at the NRC in the 1970s.
 Multi-Dynamic Image Technique — invented by Christopher Chapman in 1967.
 The trackball was first built for the DATAR computer (although the concept was first mentioned in a similar UK project)

Communications 
Canadian invented words & terms
 56k modem — invented by Dr. Brent Townshend in 1996.
735kV power line — the international standard for long-distance electricity transmission, invented by Jean-Jacques Archambault in Quebec, where the world's first 735,000-volt line was commissioned in 1965.
AM broadcasting — invented by Reginald Fessenden in 1906.
Amplitude modulation — invented by Reginald Fessenden in 1906.
BlackBerry device — its development was led by Mike Lazaridis, who founded BlackBerry Limited.
Cesium Beam atomic clock — developed by National Research Council personnel in the 1960s.
Computerized braille — invented by Roland Galarneau in 1972.
Creed teleprinter system — invented by Fredrick Creed in 1900.
Fathometer — an early form of sonar invented by Reginald A. Fessenden in 1919.
Gramophone — co-invented by Alexander Graham Bell in 1889.
Hot wire barretter — invented by Reginald A. Fessenden in 1902.
 Newsprint and pulped-wood paper — invented by Charles Fenerty in 1838.
Pager — invented by Alfred J. Gross in 1949.
Quartz clock — built by Warren Marrison in 1927.
Radio telephony — first demonstrated by Reginald A. Fessenden in 1901.
Standard time — introduced by Scottish-Canadian Sandford Fleming in 1878.
Telephone — invented by Alexander Graham Bell in 1876.
Telephone handset — invented by Cyrille Duquet in 1878
Undersea telegraph cable — invented by British-Canadian Fredric Newton Gisborne in 1857.
Walkie-talkie — invented by Donald L. Hings and Alfred J. Gross in 1942 for military use.

Food and agriculture

 Peanut butter — Canadian chemist Marcellus Gilmore Edson patented a way to make "peanut paste" also known as peanut butter in 1884.
 Butter Tarts
California roll — created by the Japanese-Canadian chef, Hidekazu Tojo, in the 1970s.
Canada Dry Ginger Ale — invented by John J. McLaughlin in 1907.
Canadian bacon
Cipaille
Canola — developed from natural rapeseed by NRC personnel in the 1970s.
Muktaaq 
Crispy Crunch — created by Harold Oswin in 1930.
Coffee Crisp
Hawaiian Pizza — invented by the Greek-Canadian cook and businessman Sam Panopoulos, in 1962.
 Instant mashed potatoes (Dehydrated potato flakes) — invented by Edward Asselbergs in 1962.
 Maple taffy
 Ambrosia apple — first cultivated in British Columbia during the early 1990s.
 Jubilee apple — developed by Pacific Agri-Food Research Centre in British Columbia.
 McIntosh apple — developed by John McIntosh (1811).
 Spartan apple — introduced to Summerland, British Columbia in 1936.
 Marquis wheat — invented by Charles E. Saunders in 1908 and tested at the Agassiz experimental farm in British Columbia..
 Montreal Melon — originally cultivated in the Montreal area but lost due to industrialization. The melon's seeds have recently been rediscovered and its cultivation revitalized.
 Nanaimo Bar
Pablum — infant cereal, invented by Frederick Tisdall, Theodore Drake, and Allan Brown in 1930.
 An early form of peanut butter was first patented by Marcellus Gilmore Edson in 1884.
 Pizza Pops
 Poutine — created in the Centre-du-Québec region in the 1950s.
 Ragoût de boulettes — traditional Canadian dish from Québec
 Ragoût de pattes
 Yukon Gold potato — invented by Gary Johnston in 1966.
 Fricot — A tradiontal stew consisting of clams, chicken and other meats.
 B.C. roll
 Tourtière
 UV-degradable Plastics — by Dr. James Guillet in 1971

Climate-related

 Rotary snowplow — invented by a Canadian dentist in 1869, and perfected by Orange Jull of Orangeville, Ontario.
Snow blower — invented by Arthur Sicard (1927).
 Steam-powered foghorn — invented by Robert Foulis (1859).

Defence

 ASDIC — invented by Robert William Boyle in 1916.
Canadian pipe mine — a land mine used in Britain in World War II.
Beartrap (helicopter device) — invented for the Royal Canadian Navy in the early 1960s
 CADPAT — the first "digital" camouflage system, which was then used for the US MARPAT (1996).
G-suit (or "anti-gravity suit") — a suit for high-altitude jet pilots invented by Wilbur R. Franks in 1941.
Defendo — a Canadian martial art
Gunstock war club
The first widely used military gas mask was introduced by Cluny MacPherson in 1915.
 Sonar — invented by Reginald Fessenden.
 Stealth Snowmobile — in 2011 the Canadian Armed Forces announced the development by Canadian-based company CrossChasm Technologies.
 Tomahawk — traditional Canadian war instrument created by the Algonquian people
 Toggling harpoon
 Kakivak
 Ulu

Domestic life & Fashion 
Alkaline battery — invented by Lewis Urry in 1954.
Bi-pin connector — invented by Reginald Fessenden in 1893.
Caesar (cocktail) — introduced in Calgary in 1969.
Ceinture fléchée —  one of many pieces of Canadian clothing listed.
Capote (garment) — worn by the inhabitants of New France to protect from the harsh winters.
Easy-Off — an oven cleaner invented by Herbert McCool in Regina in 1932.
Egg carton — invented by Joseph Coyle of Smithers, British Columbia, in 1911.
 Electric cooking range — invented by Thomas Ahearn in 1882.
Garbage bag — invented by Harry Wasylyk in 1950.
Green ink — invented by American Thomas Sterry Hunt in 1862 while teaching at Université Laval; used for various U.S. banknotes.
Incandescent light bulb — invented in 1874 by Henry Woodward, who sold the patent to Thomas Edison.
Jolly Jumper — a baby jumper invented by Olivia Poole in 1959.
Lawn sprinkler — invented by Elijah McCoy.
LongPen — invented by Margaret Atwood.
Plexiglas — made practical by William Chalmers' invention for creating methyl methacrylate, while a graduate student at McGill University in 1931.
 Wonderbra Model 1300 (aka Dream Lift) — the modern plunged-style push-up bra, designed by Louise Poirier in 1964. Though the term Wonder-Bra was coined by an American named Israel Pilot in 1935, the brand itself was popularized by Canadian Moses Nadler, who licensed (and later won) the Wonderbra patent from Pilot. Nadler made his first Wonderbra in 1939 at his Montreal-based Canadian Lady Corset Company, and directed Poirier, his employee, to design the Model 1300 bra.
 Snow goggles — used by Inuit to prevent snow blindness in the Arctic and were made typically from ivory, bone or other materials.
 Igloos — a type of shelter from the Arctic
 The first coloured coins used in circulation
 Snowshoes — perfected by First Nations to traverse through deep snow more effectively.
 Parka — invented by the Inuit in the Arctic to protect the wearer from the cold.
 Kerosene — discovered in the 1840s by Abraham Gesner.

Science and medicine

 A process for producing calcium carbide for Acetylene was invented by Thomas Willson in 1892.
 Artificial cardiac pacemaker — invented by John A. Hopps in 1950/1951.
A process to extract Bromine was invented by Herbert Henry Dow in 1890.
CPR mannequin — invented by Dianne Croteau in 1989.
Ebola vaccine — discovered by researchers at the federal Public Health Agency of Canada in 2014.
 The first practical electron microscope was built by James Hillier and Arthur Prebus in 1939.
 Explosives vapour detector EVD-1 — invented by Dr. Lorne Elias in 1985.
Finite element method, a method for numerically solving differential equations, invented by Alexander Hrennikoff
Forensic pathology in policing — introduced by Dr. Frances McGill (1877–1959).
Insulin — The process for extracting medicinal insulin was invented by Frederick Banting, Charles Best, and James Collip (1922).
Medium 199 — the world's first purely synthetic nutrient medium for growing cells, discovered in 1945 by Dr. Raymond Parker of Connaught Laboratories at the University of Toronto. Dr. Parker's achievement had a key role in the discovery of the polio vaccine.
Montreal Procedure — a treatment for severe epilepsy invented by Wilder Penfield in 1930, allowing patients to remain awake and describe their reactions while the surgeon stimulates different areas of the brain.
NeisVac‑C — a conjugate vaccine developed in 1982 by Harold Jennings and his Ottawa-based team for immunizing against Group C meningococcal meningitis.
Oil Red O — a forensic technique discovered by Alexandre Beaudoin in 2004.
Palm n’ Turn — child-proof container technology developed by Dr. Henri Breault in 1967.
Radon
Synthetic sucrose — invented by Dr. Raymond Lemieux in 1953.
Weevac 6 — a stretcher for babies invented by Wendy Murphy in 1985.

Sport, music, and entertainment 

Abdominizer — an abdominal exerciser invented by Dennis Colonello in 1984.
Basketball — invented by James Naismith in 1891.
 Birchbark biting (art)
 Baseball — The first ever recorded baseball type game in Canada was played in Beachville, Upper Canada on June 4, 1838.
 Contrabass bugle 
 Crokinole — invented by Eckhardt Wettlaufer in 1875.
 DigiSync — a barcode reader used in motion picture production that was invented by Mike Lazaridis; it won an Emmy in 1994 and Academy Award for Technical Achievement in 1998.
 Electronic sackbut — invented by Hugh Le Caine in 1945 as a precursor to voltage-controlled synthesizers.
Five-pin bowling — invented by Thomas F. Ryan in Toronto in 1909.
 Goalie mask — invented by Jacques Plante in 1959.
 Haida Art — art originally created by aboriginals on the northwest coast of Canada
Ice hockey — invented in 19th-century Canada
Ice wars — hockey boxing matches
Instant replay — invented for CBC's Hockey Night in Canada in 1955.
Jockstrap hard cup — added to the existing jockstrap undergarment by Guelph Elastic Hosiery in 1927.
 Lacrosse — codified by William George Beers around 1860.
 Pitchnut — flicking game from Canada
Ringette — invented by Sam Jacks and Mirl "Red" McCarthy in 1963.
Robb Wave Organ — world's first electric organ, invented and patented by Morse Robb in 1928.
Superman — co-created by Canadian cartoonist Joe Shuster in 1932.
 Snocross
 Six String Nation
Table hockey game — invented by Donald Munro (1930s).
 Trivial Pursuit — invented by Chris Haney and Scott Abbott in 1979.
 Tautirut — comes from the inuit culture in the north of Canada
 Television Camera — F.C.P. Henroteau in 1934
 Qilaut — originates from the Arctic and the Inuit culture

Tools and manufacturing 

 Automatic Lubricating Cup — invented by Elijah McCoy in 1872.
Caulking gun — invented by Theodore Witte in 1894.
 Collerette ladder for firefighting — invented by Montréal firefighter Rodrigue Colleret and demonstrated in London in 1896.
A process for distilling Kerosene was invented by Abraham Gesner and made the fuel popular.
Paint roller — invented by Norman James Breakey of Toronto in 1940.
Robertson screw — invented by Peter L. Robertson in 1908.
 Rotary vane pump — invented by Charles Barnes and patented in 1874.

Transportation and mobility 

 Air-conditioned railway coach — invented by Henry Ruttan in 1858.
BIXI — a public bicycle sharing system launched in Montreal in 2009.
Brunton compass — patented by David W. Brunton in 1894.
Canadarm — developed by staff of the SPAR Aerospace (1981).
Crash position indicator — invented by personnel of the National Research Council in the 1950s.
Compound steam engine for marine use — invented by Benjamin Franklin Tibbetts in 1842.
Canadian Canoe
  Electric car heater — invented by Thomas Ahearn in 1890.
Electric wheelchair — invented by George Klein in 1952 for World War II veterans.
 Electrically controlled variable-pitch propeller — invented by Wallace Rupert Turnbull and tested at CFB Borden (1927).
Hydrofoil boat — invented by Alexander Graham Bell and Casey Baldwin in 1908.
JACO — a robotic arm for wheelchair invented by Charles Deguire and Louis-Joseph Caron L'Écuyer from the Canadian technology company Kinova.
The first commercial jetliner to fly in North America — designed by James C. Floyd, the term jetliner being derived from his Avro Jetliner (1949).
Nodwell 110, a multi-purpose two-tracked vehicle - invented by Bruce Nodwell
Overhead power connection for electric streetcars — invented by John Joseph Wright (1883).
Parclo (partial cloverleaf) interchange — developed by planners at the Ontario Department of Highways
Quasiturbine — invented in 1996.
Road lines — invented by John D. Millar, an engineer for the Ontario Department of Transport. The world's first road lines were subsequently painted on a stretch of highway between Ontario and Quebec in 1930.
Screw-propeller — invented by John Patch in 1833.
Separable baggage check — invented by John Michael Lyons in 1882.
 Snowmobile — invented by Joseph-Armand Bombardier (1937).
 TM4 MФTIVE — a lightweight magnet electric motor invented by Pierre Couture in 1982.
Uno dicycle — invented by Ben Gulak while still a teenager in 2006.
Wheelchair-accessible bus — invented by Walter Harris Callow in 1947.
Variable Pitch Aircraft Propeller
ZENN — an electric car

Animal Breeds 

 Canadian Eskimo Dog — is a working breed of dog native to the Arctic.
Canadienne cattle
 Cymric cat — The Cymric is a muscular, compact, medium-to-large cat that weighs between seven and thirteen pounds and has a strong bone structure. They appear unusually rounded and have a cobby body.
 Canadian Arcott
 Newfoundland dog — An unnamed Newfoundland is famous for saving Napoleon Bonaparte from drowning.
 Canadian horse — is a breed of horse that is powerful, well-muscled, and typically dark in colour.
 Chantecler chicken
 Hare Indian Dog
 Lac La Croix Indian Pony
 Landseer dog — canine breed the Landseer was developed in Canada. In continental Europe, a black and white variant of the Newfoundland is acknowledged as a distinct breed.
 Lacombe pig — Breed of swine from Alberta
 Labrador Retriever
 Nova Scotia Duck Tolling Retriever — a hunting-focused medium-sized gundog breed.
 Newfoundland sheep
 Red Shaver — a sex-related breed of chicken called the Red Shaver was created in Canada.
 Speckle Park
 Sphynx cat — Cats of the Canadian Sphynx breed are distinguished by their lack of fur.
 St. John's water dog
 Tahltan Bear Dog
 Tonkinese cat — Tonkinese cats are intelligent, loud, lively, and typically people-oriented.

Holidays & Events 
 Canada Day
 Thanksgiving — First celebrated in 1578 in Nunavut 
 Ramp Ceremony

Occupations 

 Log driving

See also
 :Category:Canadian inventors
 The Greatest Canadian Invention, television show.
 Science and technology in Canada
 Canadian Made, television series
 Technological and industrial history of 20th-century Canada

References

External links and further reading 

 "Top 100 Inventions Made in Canada," ThoughtCo.
 Roy Mayer, Inventing Canada: 100 Years of Innovation. 

 
Canadian
Inventions and discoveries